"Adelante" is a Spanish word meaning forward. It may also refer to:

Music
 "Adelante" (Operación Triunfo song), a song from Operación Triunfo fifth series (2004)
 "Adelante" (Sash! song), 2000 Sash! song featuring Peter Faulhammer & Rodriguez
 "Adelante", a 2000 song by the American band Ché
Adelante, an album by the Chilean band Quilapayún
 Operación Triunfo 2006: Adelante, an album from Operación Triunfo

Press
Adelante (1902), an anarchist newspaper published in Spain
Adelante (Argentine newspaper), a socialist newspaper founded 1916
 Adelante (newspaper), a Cuban newspaper started in 1959

Other uses
  (1883), a former yacht known as Utowana and Oneida that was taken over by the U.S. Navy for service 1918–1919
 Adelante, former name of Napa Junction, California
 British Rail Class 180, a type of train
 Club Atlético Adelante, an Argentine sports club